Katund i Ri is a village and a former municipality in the Durrës County, western Albania. At the 2015 local government reform it became a subdivision of the municipality Durrës. The population at the 2011 census was 10,161.

References

Administrative units of Durrës
Former municipalities in Durrës County
Villages in Durrës County
Populated places disestablished in 2015